John Semple (1801–1882) was an Irish Architect who worked for the Board of First Fruits and designed such churches as Monkstown Church, Dublin and St. Marys Chapel of Ease, Dublin. He is noted for being ahead of his time in his style of architecture.

He shared his name with his father, John Semple, who worked for the Board of First Fruits. It is believed that he received his training from his father and in 1823-4 was taken into partnership with his father to the board.

Selection of Works
St. Maelruain's Church, Tallaght (1829)
Monkstown Church, Dublin (1830)
St. Marys Chapel of Ease, Dublin (1830)
Seaview Terrace Donnybrook
 Selskar Abbey, Wexford

References

Irish ecclesiastical architects
1801 births
1882 deaths
19th-century Irish architects
https://www.discoverireland.ie/wexford/selskar-abbey